Patricia Cardoso is a Colombian-American filmmaker and anthropologist who was the first Latinx woman director to have a film included in the Library of Congress's National Film Registry and to receive a Sundance Audience Award.

Her directing credits include the pilot for Amazon's Harlan Coben's Shelter, recently ordered to series and to be released in 2023. Her first feature film, Real Women Have Curves, was a box office and critical success and became a landmark of American independent film. 

Cardoso is a graduate of UCLA's film school and a Fulbright scholar; her anthropological approach to directing guides her film and television work.

Cardoso was the first Latinx woman director to receive a Student Academy Award.

Her episodic directing work includes Netflix's The Society and Tales of the City, All Rise, Emergence, Party of Five, and Diary of a Future President.

In 2021 Cardoso was invited to join the British Film Academy.

In 2019, her film Real Women Have Curves was selected by the Library of Congress for inclusion in the National Film Registry "as a cinematic treasure and worthy of preservation as part of America's patrimony".

In 2018, Ava DuVernay tapped her to direct an episode of her acclaimed television series Queen Sugar.

In 2017, Cardoso was invited to join the Academy of Motion Pictures Arts and Sciences in the Directors Branch.

Early life 
Cardoso was born and raised in Bogotá, Colombia. As a child she wrote and illustrated home-made picture-books. Only when she became a film student at UCLA she realized these books were story boards. Cardoso's first film was a humorous documentary titled Vacas Flacas y Vacas Gordas (Skinny Cows and Fat Cows) about the famine and feast periods her family endured. Due to the lack of technology in her household the film was made with toothpicks, paper, and cardboard.

She studied anthropology at Universidad de los Andes in Bogotá, Colombia.

Career 

At UCLA film school she was at the top of her class earning all major directing awards at the school: the Colin Higgins Foundation Award in Film, the Lynn Weston Fellowship in Film, and the Verna Fields Award.

Cardoso's directing credits include episodes of The Society, All Rise, and Tales of the City and the feature Teresa —the largest box office for a woman director in Colombia.

Cardoso was the first Latinx woman to win a Sundance Film Festival Dramatic Audience Award and to receive a Student Academy Award for Real Women Have Curves. She was also the first Latinx woman to have a film in the Library of Congress National film Registry.

On the creation of Real Women Have Curves, Cardoso described struggling to find funding for the film with writers Josefina Lopez and George LaVoo—many industry heads citing it as "having no market" despite its compelling script. After the script was picked up, Cardoso was officially hired to direct. She completed the casting process as well as crew assembly herself, conducting one-on-one interviews with potential crew members.

Cardoso attributes her anthropological background to the respect she has for every character in her films, the depth and dimension of her character development, and for the rigorous research she does during pre-production to create reality and truthfulness in her movies.

Cardoso's Real Women Have Curves broke many conventions of traditional Hollywood filmmaking and became a landmark in American independent film. According to Entertainment Weekly, it is "one of the most influential movies of the 2000s," and cast "a wide shadow over the new generation of filmmakers to come." The movie is cited for showing "the impact a movie could have in the culture," and it is acclaimed for its nuanced portrayal of its characters and of Los Angeles.

According to an interview with The L.A. Times, Cardoso struggled to find work after the success of Real Women Have Curves. Since her spouts of TV movies throughout the 2000s and 2010s, she has caught the attention of filmmaker Ava DuVernay, with whom she directed an episode of her drama Queen Sugar in 2016.

In September 2021, Cardoso's Real Women earned the main spot at the Significant Movies and Movie Makers Gallery, held at the Academy Museum of Motion Pictures. Clips and stills from Real Women were the only ones depicted in color. According to an assistant curator of the gallery, Sophia Serrano, the museum wanted Real Women to "stand out as the hero of the gallery."

Cardoso also donated film's script notes, casting calls, storyboards, production stills, location scouting photos and design drawings to the academy's Margaret Herrick Library as part of the Patricia Cardoso Papers; making her work a public resource and allow the curators to resurface various parts of it in future exhibits.

Filmography

Real Women Have Curves

Directed by Patricia Cardoso, this groundbreaking drama is based on the comedic play of the same name by Josefina Lopez, who co-wrote the screenplay with George LaVoo. At just 17, the film is Latina actress America Ferrera's feature debut. She stars alongside Latin-American acting legends like Lupe Ontiveros and George Lopez. The film follows a high school student named Ana who lives in Boyle Heights with her mother, father and grandfather. Ana works with her mother in a factory making designer gowns. Tension in the family rises when Ana receives a scholarship to Columbia University; she wants to accept, but her critical mother believes she should focus on settling down with a husband and beginning a family after high school. As Ana's mother Carmen continuously criticizes her choices, body and beliefs throughout the film, Ana grows in confidence and decides to deem her worth as a woman in her own way. The film is shot in a unique vignette style, with no significant plot driving the film aside from Ana's personal development. The film is praised for its lively and warm portrayal of East L.A. culture and commentaries on capitalistic class struggle.

El Regalo
Written and produced by Dago García and directed by Cardoso, the film stars Cesar Mora, Ella Becerra, Javier Ramirez and Margalida Castro.

The Toymaker
Directed and produced by Cardoso the documentary film is about Horst Damme, a blind German toymaker, who has lived in Bogotá since 1936 when he arrived with his family as refugees from Nazi-Germany.

La Clave
Directed by Cardoso and written by Josefina Lopez the short film tells the story of a family faced with the mental illness of their daughter. The film stars Mariana Montes, Luis Enrique, and Ivette Gonzales. The film won the First Place Drama Short for the United Latino Film Festival, a Gold CINDY Award, a Robert Townsend Social Issues Award and Merit Special Mention at The Best Shorts Competition.

Meddling Mom
Directed by Cardoso, written by Nina Weiman and produced by Frank Konigsberg and Patricia Clifford, Meddling Mom was the first Latino film ever made by Hallmark Channel. The film stars Sonia Braga, as Carmen Vera, a ceramics art dealer and meddling mother pursued by a charming dance professor played by Tony Plana. The film was nominated to an IMAGEN Award for Sonia Braga's strong performance.
Carmen Vega is guilty of being a meddling mom. Her crimes include slipping into daughter Yolanda's home to leave behind "how-to" books on starting a family and manipulating daughter Ally into a doomed relationship with her best friend Marisol's son Pablo. Now Carmen Vega, notorious mother of good intentions, is about to get a crash course in butting out and maybe she'll even find a romantic life of her own.
The film was shot on location at Jose Vera's Fine Arts and Antiques wonderful store in Eagle Rock.

Ro
Cardoso directed a six-episode web series for  YouTube channel WIGS. Ro, a young woman in parole, played by Melonie Diaz,  goes to a speed dating bar trying to rebuild his life after prison. The series was produced by Rodrigo García, John Avnet and Jake Avnet.
The series is written by talented Mattie Brickman and stars along Diaz William Mapother, Jonathan Tucker and Christopher Carley.

Lies in Plain Sight
Cardoso directed the remake of the Israeli movie . Written by Teena Booth based on Noa Greenberg's script the film stars Rosie Perez, Martha Higadera, Chad Michael Murray and Benito Martinez. It was produced by Frank Konigsberg and Yan Fisher-Romanovsky for Sony Television and Lifetime.
The story of Eva and her blind cousin Sofia (Martha Higadera), who were inseparable as children, with Eva the loyal companion who helped Sofia through her tough adolescent years. When Eva suddenly commits suicide, Sofia rushes home to her father, Hector (Benito Martinez), and Eva's parents, Marisol (Rosie Perez) and Rafael (Yul Vásquez), to find answers. But the more she delves into Eva's life, questioning her past boyfriend's Ethan (Chad Michael Murray) and Christian (Christoph Sanders), the more Sofia realizes that their childhood was actually filled with dark, disturbing secrets.
The film received a NAMIC Vision Award, an IMAGEN Award for Martha Higadera's performance and was selected as Lifetime Movie of the Year in 2011. It was nominated to an NAACP Image Award for Rosie Perez's performance.

Awards 

Cardoso received:

 Smithsonian Institution Latino Recognition Award
 Reconocimiento Fulbright a la Excelencia
 UCLA Filmmaker Of The Year Honor
 Hubert Bals Fund for Film Production - International Film Festival Rotterdam
 Visionary Award LA Femme Film Festival
 California Governor's Commendation

References

External links

Biography in the HBO web site
Patricia Cardoso's Aha Moment in Oprah Magazine
15 Latino Directors Challenging Hollywood's Huge Diversity Problem
15 years later Real Women Have Curves remains one of the most important films for brown girls
New Academy Members Speak
El Oscar en la "Tierra del Olvido"
Una colombiana en el cine americano
Patricia Cardoso at the Strasberg Institute
Patricia Cardoso Papers at Margaret Herrick Library
Significant Movies and Moviemakers Gallery

Screenwriters from California
American producers
American women film directors
Living people
Year of birth missing (living people)
Colombian film directors
UCLA Film School alumni
Film directors from California
Film producers from California
Colombian emigrants to the United States
People from Bogotá
American women film producers
21st-century American women
University of Los Andes (Colombia) alumni